The Spiritual Formation Bible is a study Bible that has an emphasis on Spiritual formation. It may refer to any of these 4 published titles:

 The Spiritual Formation Bible (NIV)
 The Spiritual Formation Bible: Growing in Intimacy with God Through Scripture (NRSV)
 The Renovare Spiritual Formation Study Bible (NRSV)
 The Life with God Bible (NRSV)

References

Study Bibles